Emma Bonney is an English world champion player of English billiards, and snooker player. She has won the women's world billiards title a record thirteen times.

Emma Bonney is the only player to be ranked number 1 in the world at both snooker and billiards at the same time.

Biography
Bonney was born on 13 July 1976 in Portsmouth.

English billiards
Bonney has won the women's world billiards title a record thirteen times. Bonney won the first of her world billiards championship titles in 2000, having been runner-up in 1998.

On 8 April 2010, she won her fifth World Ladies Billiards title at the Hall Green Stadium, Birmingham, beating Chitra Magimairaj of India 269–220 in the final.

Bonney won her 13th world billiards championship, and sixth consecutive victory, in 2018. The 2019 World Women's Billiards Championship was held in Australia, and Bonney did not participate.

Snooker
Bonney has been the runner-up in the World Women's Snooker Championship  three times. She lost the final of the 2006 championship to Reanne Evans 3–5. In 2011 she again to Evans, 1–5. In 2015 Bonney lost 2–6 to Ng On Yee.

Bonney won two women's ranking tournaments in 2008, the South Coast Classic and the British Open. She won her third ranking tournament in 2012, the Southern Women's Classic championship, using a  that she had recently bought and had only used for five hours of practice before the competition.

She was runner-up to Evans in the 2008 European Snooker Championships.

Her highest ranking in women's snooker was 1st.

Career finals
Billiards

Snooker

References

External links
World Ladies Billiards Champions  World Billiards
Player Profile – Emma Bonney Women's World Snooker

1976 births
Living people
Sportspeople from Portsmouth
English snooker players
Female snooker players
Female players of English billiards
English players of English billiards
World champions in English billiards